The Dog and the Sheep is one of Aesop’s Fables and is numbered 478 in the Perry Index. Originally its subject was the consequence of bearing false witness. However, longer treatments of the story during the Middle Ages change the focus to deal with perversions of justice by the powerful at the expense of the poor. It has sometimes been alternatively titled The Wolf, the Dog and the Sheep in order to distinguish it from the fable of the dispute between the sheep and the dog that guards them (Perry 356).

A change of focus
The fable as originally told by Phaedrus records the fate reserved to liars. A dog took a sheep to law over a loaf that he claimed to have given it and was supported by a wolf called as witness. Though the sheep lost the case, it later came across the wolf dead in a ditch and drew the moral that this was as a result of heavenly punishment.

After the social breakdown of the Middle Ages, the fable's focus changed to misuse of justice and the fate of the poor in the many Latin versions recording it. Walter of England's fable is much grimmer. The dog is supported in his accusation by three false witnesses, the kite, vulture and wolf, and the sheep has to cover the cost by selling its wool in mid-winter. Nor does any heavenly punishment follow. The moral is simply that this is the way of the world:
Sepe fidem falso mendicat inertia teste,
Sepe dolet pietas criminis arte capi
("Often laziness begs faith in false witness, often justice is the captive of criminal deceit"). Indeed, in the slightly later French version of Marie de France, it is the lamb that dies of cold. This had always been the intention of its carnivorous false accusers, the wolf, the kite and the dog, who then divide its body between them.

Marie de France's poem comprises 42 octosyllabic lines, of which the last eight provide a commentary on how law has been corrupted by the powerful to oppress the poor. During the course of the 15th century two more authors used the fable to comment at even greater length on this social abuse still needing redress. The poems were the work of the Chaucerian poets John Lydgate and Robert Henryson, both of whom composed short collections of Aesop's fables, using decasyllabic rhyme royal. Lydgate's  The Tale of the Hownde and the Shepe, groundyd agen perjuré and false wytnes comprises 32 of these seven-line stanzas, of which some sixteen are devoted to a denunciation of perjury and greed. The story itself is told with satirical intent, with its introduction of the false witnesses as "The faithful wolf, in trowth that doth delite,/ And with hym comyth the gentil foule, the kyte". As in Marie de France, the sheep perishes and is divided between its accusers.

Henryson had trained in law and many of the 25 stanzas of his Taill of the Scheip and the Doig are devoted to a description of the legal process in the Scotland of his day. Here the wolf plays the part of judge, the raven is the summoner, while the kite and the vulture are lawyers. The unrepresented sheep is browbeaten into forfeiting its wool to compensate the dog but survives to utter his complaint to Heaven: 
Now few, or none, will justice execute,
And rich men aye the poor will overthrow.
And truth itself, even when judges know,
Will be ignored, some profit for to win.

The fable continued to be related in the Renaissance as an exemplary story even after reforms in the law. Hieronymus Osius devoted a short Neo-Latin poem to it in which the sheep is dunned for "certain measures of wheat", as Roger L'Estrange termed it in his own prose version of 1692. John Ogilby and Samuel Croxall returned to the more violent ending in their versions, where the dog tears the sheep to pieces at the end of the legal process to divide between his confederates. Besides offering the usual conclusions in his 'application', Croxall - with the long struggle against Stuart misrule in mind - goes on to comment that "it is hard to determine which resemble Brutes most, they in acting or the People in suffering them to act their vile, selfish Schemes."

The Russian fabulist Ivan Krylov made substantial changes to the original version of Phaedrus in his fable of "The Peasant and the Sheep". In particular he adapted the story to satirise his own time and country and, like Henryson before him, put particular emphasis on detailing legal language and process. In this case a peasant takes a sheep to court, accusing it of having eaten two of his fowls. The judge is a fox (or a wolf in the earlier version), who refuses to believe the sheep's plea that it is not an eater of such delicious fare. The sheep is therefore condemned to death; its flesh is reserved for the court's use and its pelt is awarded to the peasant. In a time of strict censorship, Krylov did not bother to draw a moral; the manifest absurdity of the proceedings makes its own point. The poem was later set as a song by Alexander Gretchaninov among his "Fables After Ivan Krylov".

Comparison of versions

References

External links
 16th -19th century illustrations

Aesop's Fables
Abuse of the legal system